Tengku Amalin A'ishah Putri binti Almarhum Sultan Ismail Petra (born 26 June 1984) is a member of the Kelantan Royal Family. She is the youngest sibling and only sister of the current Sultan of Kelantan, Sultan Muhammad V.

Early life and education 
Tengku Amalin was born in Kota Bharu, Kelantan on 26 June 1984 as the youngest child and only daughter of the 28th Sultan of Kelantan, Sultan Ismail Petra and Raja Perempuan Tengku Anis. Her siblings are Sultan Muhammad V (the current Sultan of Kelantan and the 15th Yang di-Pertuan Agong of Malaysia), Tengku Muhammad Faiz Petra (the Tengku Mahkota of Kelantan) and Tengku Muhammad Fakhry Petra (the Tengku Bendahara of Kelantan).

Tengku Amalin received her early education at Tengku Anis Kindergarten. She continued her primary education at Zainab Primary School (2) and her secondary education at Naim Lil-Banat Islamic Secondary School (2). She attended Centre For Foundation Studies International Islamic University of Malaysia (lIUM) and later continued with her studies at IIUM reading both Civil Laws and Shariah Laws. Four years later, she obtained her Bachelor of Laws (LLB) (Hons). She then pursued her studies at the University of Melbourne reading Master of Law (LLM).

Career 
Upon graduating, on 20 June 2006, Tengku Amalin joined the Judicial and Legal Service Commission as
a judicial officer. Kota Bharu Magistrate's Court was Tengku Amalin’s first posting until 15 July 2009. One of her cases she handled was the case of businessman Datuk Nik Sapeia Nik Yusoff spraying the former Prime Minister of Malaysia Tun Dr Mahathir Mohamad's eyes with a dangerous chemical sprayer. She also received criticism from scholars in Kelantan and caused controversy in the state for sentencing a religious school student to prison for only wearing turban while riding a motorcycle before being arrested by law enforcement in Kubang Kerian in January 2009.

Tengku Amalin then was posted as Senior Deputy Registrar and Deputy Registrar at Kuala Lumpur High Court (Civil) until 15 July 2012. Her task was to hear and determine disputes between litigants in civil cases, and their sentences if convicted. She set up her own law firm Messrs Tengku Amalin & Faizi on 25 November 2013.

Personal life 
Tengku Amalin married Pengiran Muda Abdul Qawi, a member of the Brunei Royal Family in Kota Bharu, Kelantan on 27 June 2013. She gave birth to their first child and eldest daughter, Pengiran Anak Tengku Afeefah Musyafaah Bolkiah Putri, on 13 April 2014. On 24 June 2016, she gave birth to their second child and second daughter, Pengiran Anak Tengku Azzahra Iffatul Bolkiah Putri. She gave birth to their third child and third daughter, Pengiran Anak Tengku Zaafirah Muizzah Bolkiah Putri, who was born on 12 February 2020. On 26 June 2022, she gave birth to their fourth child and first son, Pengiran Anak Tengku Abdul Muhaimin.

Title and honour 
Tengku Amalin was conferred the title of Tengku Maharani Putri (literally the "Senior Royal Princess") by her eldest brother, Sultan Muhammad V on 3 March 2019.

  :
  Recipient of the Royal Family Order of Kelantan or Star of Yunus (DK) (26 June 2006)

Ancestry

References 

Royal House of Kelantan
1984 births
Living people
Malaysian people of Malay descent
Malaysian Muslims
People from Kota Bharu
People from Kelantan
Daughters of monarchs